International is a greatest hits album by English rock band New Order, released on 29 October 2002 by London Records.

Background
It was released solely in certain countries—the United Kingdom notably excluded, although imports were available. Available editions include those from France with a limited-edition bonus CD and from the United States with a limited edition bonus DVD.

As it came out in the same year as the 4/5 disc Retro compilation, many New Order fans did not purchase International, particularly those fans in the countries in which it was never sold.

One new track, the single "Here to Stay" from the 24 Hour Party People soundtrack, was, however, included on International, which was not on Retro, providing a possible incentive to those fans waiting for Retro.

As of April 2006, the album had sold 62,000 copies in the United States, according to Nielsen SoundScan.

Track listing

Charts

References

New Order (band) compilation albums
2002 greatest hits albums
London Records compilation albums